Tobernalt is a holy well  in north County Sligo, Ireland near the southwest corner of Lough Gill. It is an ancient natural spring dating back to the 5th century as a pagan meeting place and later a Penal Law mass site.

 it is maintained by St John's Parish, Carraroe, Sligo. Masses are conducted at the site. The devoted from surrounding counties and elsewhere make pilgrimages to the site on Garland Sunday when a day-long schedule of devotions is held.

It is associated with St. Patrick whose fingerprints are said to be in the stones of one of the altars.

References

External links

Tobernalt Holy Well website by St. John's Parish
Various pictures at MegalithicIreland

Holy wells in Ireland
Springs of Ireland
Christian holy places